Brenda McGrory (born 29 April 1956) is an Irish former swimmer. She competed in three events at the 1972 Summer Olympics.

References

External links
 

1956 births
Living people
Irish female swimmers
Olympic swimmers of Ireland
Swimmers at the 1972 Summer Olympics
Place of birth missing (living people)
20th-century Irish women